Fort Harrison was a Confederate fort built to defend Richmond, Virginia during the American Civil War.

Fort Harrison may also refer to:

Fort Harrison, Indiana, an American fort built near present-day Terre Haute in 1811
Fort Harrison, Florida, a U.S. military outpost that operated on the west coast of Florida during the Second Seminole War
Fort Benjamin Harrison, U.S. Army post in Marion County, Indiana
Fort William Henry Harrison, a National Guard post in Montana
Daniel Harrison House, Rockingham County, Virginia, designated by the legislature as Fort Harrison during the French and Indian War

See also
Fort Harrison Hotel, part of the headquarters for the Church of Scientology in Clearwater, Florida
Fort Harrison State Park, Indiana State Park, located near and named for Fort Benjamin Harrison
Fort Harrison National Cemetery, cemetery near Richmond, Virginia